Shawanaga 17B is a First Nations reserve on Georgian Bay in Parry Sound District, Ontario. It is one of the reserves of the Shawanaga First Nation.

References

External links
 Canada Lands Survey System

Anishinaabe reserves in Ontario
Communities in Parry Sound District